Morville-sur-Andelle is a commune in the Seine-Maritime department in the Normandy region in northern France.

Geography

Population

Places of interest
 The church of Saint-Ouen is 18th century with vestiges from the 13th century in the tower. The bronze bell dates from 1657.
 Moulin (mill) de l'Andelle, situated at Imberville, built in 1839.

See also
Communes of the Seine-Maritime department

References

Communes of Seine-Maritime